Víctor Dínenzon (born 1952 in Buenos Aires) is an Argentine film director and screen writer.

He directed and wrote the script to the 1988 film, Abierto de 18 a 24.

Filmography
DirectorAlgún lugar en ninguna parte(2008)Nieves(2004)Fugaz(2003)Mar de amores(1998)Las boludas(1993)Fútbol argentino(1990)Abierto de 18 a 24(1988)
ProducciónNieves(2004)
GuionistaAlgún lugar en ninguna parte(2008)Nieves(2004)Fugaz(2003)Mar de amores(1998)Las boludas(1993)Abierto de 18 a 24(1988)
FotografíaNieves(2004)
Assistante de DirecciónLa cruz invertida(1985)Asesinato en el Senado de la Nación(1984)

External links
 

1952 births
Living people
Dinezon, Victor
Argentine film directors
Argentine screenwriters
Male screenwriters
Argentine male writers